The Lovers Rock Tour was the fifth concert tour by English band Sade. Predominately visiting amphitheaters in North America, the tour supported the band's fifth studio album, Lovers Rock. Taking place in 2001, it was deemed by many critics as a comeback tour because it marks the band's first performances since 1994. Although many believed the trek would expand to other countries, this did not come to fruition. With over 40 shows, it became the 13th biggest tour in North America, earning over 26 million.

Background
The tour was announced via Sade's website in April 2001. The announcement stated the tour would begin in the summer of 2001 with 30 shows. Initial dates were rescheduled due to extended rehearsal time. The shows sold well, with many stops adding additional shows. In August 2001, the tour was extended by eight weeks, due to ticket demand. The tour was produced by SFX Entertainment and was the band's first tour in seven years, following the Love Deluxe World Tour. The tour also marks the band's final performances until 2011's tour, Sade Live.

Opening acts
India Arie (select dates)
Youssou N'Dour (Los Angeles—22 July)
Phuz (select dates)

Setlist
"Cherish the Day"
"Your Love Is King"
"Somebody Already Broke My Heart" (includes excerpt of "Never as Good as the First Time")
"Cherry Pie"
"Pearls"
"Every Word"
"Smooth Operator"
"Redeye"
"Jezebel"
"Kiss of Life"
"Slave Song"
"The Sweetest Gift"
"The Sweetest Taboo"
"Lovers Rock"
"Immigrant"
"Paradise"
"King of Sorrow"
"No Ordinary Love"
"By Your Side"
Encore
"Flow"
"Is It a Crime"
"It's Only Love That Gets You Through"
Source:

Tour dates

Cancellations and rescheduled shows

Box office box score

Broadcasts and recordings

The concerts in Anaheim and Inglewood were chronicled for the band's first live CD/DVD recording respectively titled, Lovers Live. The live recordings were released in February 2002 and topped the charts in the United States, Belgium and Italy. The album sold over 500,000 copies in the U.S., adding a gold record to the band's repertoire.

Critical reception
The tour received high praise from music critics in the U.S. and Canada. Steve Baltin (Rolling Stone) found Adu's vocal performance effortless, during the show at the KeyArena. He says, "Musically, some of the other peak moments were a stunning 'No Ordinary Love'; a moving 'By Your Side'; a buoyant 'Paradise,' and 'King of Sorrow'. After closing with 'By Your Side,' Sade and her band left to a deafening ovation. The three-song encore was highlighted by a vocally powerful 'Is It a Crime,' in which Sade let loose with great success".

Jason Reynolds (NME) writes the band left the crowd at the Hollywood Bowl "beaming". He continues, "As Sade steps out on to the stage, she instantly captures the hearts of the crowd. Still looking stunning, she exudes a magnetism that draws them into her spell. It's very simple – no choreographed dance routines, no pyrotechnics – just Sade herself. The voice". For the concert at the Verizon Wireless Amphitheater in Selma; Rauol Hernandez stated despite the heatwave in the CenTex area, Sade was the "storm" the area needed. He further states, "The thunder and lightning video was especially apropos. Sade's quiet storm really is 'The Sweetest Taboo'".

Adu's vocals were deemed smooth as silk for the concert in Rosemont. Corey Moss (MTV News) writes, "Unlike Madonna and Janet Jackson, the other pop divas on tour this summer, Sade doesn't overly decorate her tunes with costumes and choreography". Jane Stevenson (Toronto Sun) gave the performance at the Air Canada Centre 4 out of 5 stars. She explains, "What else would you expect from a singer who was the epitome of cool way back in 1984 with the release of her debut album and has barely changed her trademark laid-back, jazz-inflected R&B grooves or classic ponytail and hoop earrings look since then"?

Issac Guzman (New York Daily News) mentioned the band displayed a passion for music and their fans. He says, "When she sang the title song of last year's 'Lovers Rock' album, she was referring not so much to rock music, but to a solid foundation on which one might build a relationship. This relationship, of course, is best constructed in a vaguely exotic milieu where people rendezvous in small cafes on the French Riviera or dance on the veranda of a private villa stocked with Champagne". Jon Pareles (The New York Times) writes the band displayed various emotions throughout the show at the famous Madison Square Garden. He continues, "Sade still sang with the pauses and hesitations she learned from [Billie] Holiday, but every so often when she reached a confession of great pain or joy, she dispelled the smoke in her voice to reveal a pure, indelible ache. Even when she sang more demurely, it was clear that her composure was anything but nonchalant".

Personnel
Sade Adu – vocals
Andrew Hale – keyboards
Stuart Matthewman – guitar, saxophone
Paul S. Denman – bass
Karl Vanden Bossche – percussion
Charlie Bouis – recording engineer
Ian Duncan – digital editing
Lynn Jeffrey – personal assistant
Eric Johnston – assistant engineer
Pete Lewinson – drums
Tony Momrelle – vocals
Sophie Muller – image design
Andrew Nichols – assistant mixer
Leroy Osbourne – flute, guitar, vocals
Howard Page – engineer
Mike Pela – mixing
Ryan Waters – guitar

References

2001 concert tours
Concert tours of Canada
Concert tours of the United States
Sade (band) concert tours